Sara Ballingall (born c. 1972–1973) is a Canadian former actress. She is best known for playing Melanie Brodie in the teen drama television series Degrassi Junior High and Degrassi High.

Acting career 
On Degrassi, Ballingall played the role of Melanie Brodie, a "skinny schoolgirl with crooked teeth" who had romantic feelings towards Archie "Snake" Simpson, played by Stefan Brogren. She was named a UNICEF Goodwill Ambassador along with her co-stars in April 1989. Ballingall left the series in 1990.

References

Sources 

 

1972 births
Canadian television actresses
Actresses from Toronto
Living people